Klinkert is a surname. Notable people with the surname include:

Brigitte Klinkert (born 1956), French politician
H. C. Klinkert (1829–1913), Dutch Mennonite missionary 
Michael Klinkert (born 1968), German footballer